Coppanagh is a hill in County Kilkenny, Ireland. At 365 metres (1,198 ft) it is the second highest summit in Kilkenny behind Brandon Hill and the 886th highest summit in Ireland. Both Coppanagh and Brandon Hill are situated near Mount Alto.

See also 
 Geography of Ireland
 List of mountains in Ireland

References

References
MountainViews.ie

Mountains and hills of County Kilkenny
Marilyns of Ireland